500th may refer to:

500th (1st Wessex) Field Company, Royal Engineers
500th Air Defense Group, disbanded United States Air Force (USAF) organization
500th Air Expeditionary Group Constituted as 500th Bombardment Group
500th Bombardment Squadron, inactive United States Air Force unit
500th Brigade, also known as the Kfir (Young Lion) Formation, a regular-service tank brigade from 1972 to 2003
500th Fighter-Bomber Squadron, inactive United States Air Force unit
500th Heavy Anti-Aircraft Regiment, Royal Artillery, a Scottish air defence unit of Britain's Territorial Army
500th Military Intelligence Brigade (United States)
500th Simpsons episode or At Long Last Leave, the 14th episode of the 23rd season of the American animated television series
500th SS Parachute Battalion, the parachute unit of the Waffen-SS
Emmerdale Village's 500th anniversary, Emmerdale being a fictional village in the Yorkshire Dales in a British soap opera

See also
500 (disambiguation)